Quarterliah Creek is a stream in the U.S. state of Mississippi.

Quarterlial is a name derived from the Choctaw language purported to mean "stagnant water". A variant name is "Quarterlial Creek".

References

Rivers of Mississippi
Rivers of Jasper County, Mississippi
Rivers of Newton County, Mississippi
Mississippi placenames of Native American origin